Sharaf Mahfood (Arabic: شرف محفوظ) (born 20 July 1966) is a Yemeni football striker for Club Al-Tilal، Yemen's top scorer of the season: 1990–91،  He played for Yemen national football team in the qualification series for the 1994 FIFA World Cup.

Honours

Club
Al-Tilal'

Yemeni League: 2
1990–91,2004/05
Yemeni Presidents Cup: 1
2007
Yemeni Naseem Cup: 2
2000, 2003
Yemeni Unity Cup: 1
1999
Yemeni Ali Muhsin al-Murisi Cup: 1
2003

References

1966 births
Living people
Yemeni footballers
Yemen international footballers
Yemeni expatriate footballers
Yemeni expatriate sportspeople in Lebanon
Expatriate footballers in Lebanon
Association football forwards
Al-Tilal SC players
Tadamon Sour SC players
Footballers at the 1990 Asian Games
Yemeni League players
Asian Games competitors for Yemen
Lebanese Premier League players